Neşe Yılmaz (born 15 January 1976), known by her stage name Zara, is a popular Turkish folk singer and actress of Kurdish descent. She was born in Üsküdar district of Istanbul on 15 January 1976. She released eight albums using the nickname "Neşecik".

She married İskender Ulus, the owner of the recording company Ulus Müzik, in 2002. They divorced in 2007. Her second marriage was to Akif Beki, the chief counselor of Recep Tayyip Erdoğan and journalist in Hürriyet newspaper, in 2012. Their daughter Dila was born in December. The couple divorced in July 2016.

Discography

As "Neşecik"

 Eyvahlar Olsun (1986)
 Yaşamak Bu Değil (1987)
 Garibim (1988)
 Taptığım Allah, Sevdiğim Sensin (1989)
 Acımasız Dünya (1990)
 Çek Kara Tren (1991)
 Canım Askerim (1994)
 Gurbet & Ağla Sevdiğim (1995)

Filmography

TV programs

References

1976 births
Living people
Kurdish women singers
Turkish folk singers
Turkish people of Kurdish descent
Singers from Istanbul
People from Üsküdar
Istanbul Technical University alumni
21st-century Turkish singers
21st-century Turkish women singers